Elza Kövesházi-Kalmár (1876-1956) was a Hungarian sculptor known for her Art Nouveau and Art Deco sculptures.

Biography
Kövesházi-Kalmár was born on 1 January 1876 in Vienna, Austria. She studied in  Vienna and Munich. She was a member of the Künstlerinnen group, the Hagenbund and the Hungarian artists' association Kéve.

Among her awards she was the recipient of a silver medal at the 1926 World's Fair in Philadelphia and a silver and bronze at the 1937 Paris World's Fair. Despite this recognition, she was unable to support herself as an artist and she turned to creating orthopedic shoes for a living.

Kövesházi-Kalmár died on 3 September 1956 in Budapest.

Legacy
Her work was included in the 2019 exhibition City Of Women: Female artists in Vienna from 1900 to 1938 at the Österreichische Galerie Belvedere.

References

1876 births
1956 deaths
Hungarian women sculptors
19th-century women artists
20th-century Hungarian women artists
Artists from Vienna